Bob Bradbury was a professional rugby league footballer who played in the 1920s.

Playing career

County Cup Final appearances
Bob Bradbury played , i.e. number 2, and scored the only try in Warrington's 7-5 victory over Oldham in the 1921 Lancashire Cup Final during the 1921–22 season at The Cliff, Broughton, Salford on Saturday 3 December 1921, in front of a crowd of 18,000.

Club career
Bob Bradbury made his début for Warrington on 27 November 1920, and he played his last match for Warrington on 7 October 1922.

References

External links
Search for "Bradbury" at rugbyleagueproject.org
Statistics at wolvesplayers.thisiswarrington.co.uk

English rugby league players
Place of birth missing
Place of death missing
Rugby league wingers
Warrington Wolves players
Year of birth missing
Year of death missing